RAC/CDC42 exchange factor, also known as GEFT, is a human gene.

Interactions 

GEFT has been shown to interact with RHOA.

References

Further reading